Marcel Laurent (6 June 1913 – 9 August 1994) was a French racing cyclist. He rode in the 1937 Tour de France.

References

1913 births
1994 deaths
French male cyclists
Place of birth missing